John Reading (c. 1645–1692) was an English composer and organist, and father of John Reading (c. 1685 – 1764) who is remembered as an important music copyist.

Little of Reading's life is known. He was born in Lincoln, Lincolnshire, and became Master of the Choristers at Lincoln Cathedral in 1670, and in 1675 at Chichester Cathedral and at Winchester Cathedral. From 1681 until his death he was organist at Winchester College. Here he set the college's Latin graces to music as well as the school song Dulce domum. Several of his organ works were included in a collection which was completed by Daniel Roseingrave. He also composed songs, theatre music, and part of a set of responses (now in the Anglican church repertoire in a form completed by modern editors). He died in Winchester.

References
The New Grove Dictionary of  Music & Musicians; edited by Stanley Sadie; Macmillan Publishers Limited 1980, 

1640s births
1692 deaths
English Baroque composers
English classical composers
English classical organists
British male organists
Cathedral organists
Anglicanism
17th-century classical composers
English male classical composers
17th-century English musicians
17th-century male musicians
Male classical organists